Erin go Bragh, sometimes Erin go Braugh, is the anglicisation of an Irish language phrase, and is used to express allegiance to Ireland. It is most often translated as "Ireland Forever."

Origin 
Erin go Bragh is an anglicisation of the phrase  in the Irish language.

In all other dialects the distinction between the nominative  and the dative  is retained. This linguistic shift (dative forms replacing nominative) is common among Irish nouns of the second and fifth declensions.

The term  is equivalent to 'eternity' or 'end of time', meaning the phrase may be translated literally as 'Ireland until eternity' or 'Ireland to the end (of time)'.  (or ) is also used in Irish and means the same thing.  is a preposition, translatable as 'to', 'till/until', 'up to'.

Usage

United Irishmen 
The phrase first came to use by the United Irishmen organisation in the 1790s.

Emigrant nationalism 
In 1847 a group of Irish volunteers, including U.S. Army deserters, joined the Mexican side in the Mexican–American War. Similar flag designs have been used at different times to express Irish nationalism.

In 1862, when a large number of families on the estate of Lord Digby, near Tullamore, County Offaly, were given notice to quit, a local priest, Father Paddy Dunne, arranged passage for 400 people to Australia. A ship was chartered from the Black Ball Line and named the Erin-go-Bragh. The voyage of the Erin-go-Bragh, a "crazy, leaky tub", took 196 days, the longest recorded passage to Australia. A passenger nicknamed the ship the "Erin-go-Slow", but eventually it landed in Moreton Bay near Brisbane.

A pub in Sydney, Australia, in the 19th century that catered to Irish immigrants was called The Erin-Go-Bragh.

Unionism 
At the height of decades of negotiation regarding home rule in Ireland, in the late 19th century the Irish Unionist Party used the slogan on a banner at one of their conventions, expressing their pride in Irish identity.

Sport 
In the late 19th century, the Edinburgh football club Hibernian F.C. adopted Erin Go Bragh as their motto and it adorned their shirts accordingly. Founded in 1875 by Edinburgh Irishmen and the local Catholic Church, St Patrick's, the club's shirts included a gold harp set on a green background. The flag can still be seen at a lot of Hibernian matches to this day.

In 1887 a gaelic games club was set up in Clonsilla, Dublin under the name Erin go Bragh GAA. There is also an "Erin go Bragh GAA" club in Warwickshire, England.

In 1906, three Irishmen went to Athens, Greece to compete in the 1906 Intercalated Olympics as an Irish team independent of Britain. They had distinct uniforms and intended to compete for the first time as representatives of their own country. Once in Athens, the Irishmen became aware that the British committee had decided that they would instead compete under the British flag. Peter O'Connor won the silver medal for the long jump. As he was about to receive his medal he rushed towards the flag pole, climbed the pole, and flew the Erin Go Bragh flag, as the Tricolour had not yet received widespread acceptance. The other Irish athletes and a number of Irish-American athletes fended off security for a few minutes while the flag was flown. It was the first time an Irish flag had been flown at a sporting event.

Other uses 

A traditional Scottish song from the 19th century entitled "Erin-go-Bragh" tells the story of a Highland Scot who is mistaken for an Irishman. The first two verses are:

 
 In 1969, the band The Wolfe Tones released a song called "Erin Go Bragh" on their LP Rifles of the IRA. The song tells of the Easter Rising in Dublin, with all 6 verses ending with "Erin Go Bragh".
 A version of the traditional Scottish song opens Dick Gaughan's 1981 album Handful of Earth. Andy Irvine and Patrick Street recorded Gaughan's version of the song on their 2007 album On the Fly.
 The expression was paraphrased by a punning New York Times headline Erin go broke, written by economist Paul Krugman, referring to the post-2008 Irish financial crisis.
 In the 2009 film The Boondock Saints II: All Saints Day Norman Reedus's character Murphy MacManus phrases it as: "It's Irish for, 'you're fucked.'"
 "Erin go Bragh" (1943) is also a rhapsody for brass band composed by Joan Trimble (1915–2000)

See also 
  (Scottish Gaelic cry: 'Scotland forever!')
 Faugh A Ballagh ( "Clear the way!")
  ('Our day will come!')
  (Welsh cry: 'Wales forever!')

References 

Irish culture
Irish words and phrases
Hibernian F.C.